Nonami  is the area in Tempaku-ku, Nagoya surrounding Nonami Station.

Because it is located on the border of Midori-ku, Nagoya and Tempaku-ku, Nagoya, many customers from Tempaku-ku patronize businesses in Nonami.

Overview
 Although there are numerous establishments (bookstores, convenience stores, etc.) close to the station, big shopping malls are not visible from the station.
 While there are many old buildings, for the sake of having many modern buildings, in the downtown area, there are many kinds of streets especially more modern ones.
 About a five-minute walk from the station, by Tempaku River, are noticeable construction facilities.
 Nonami Station is the last stop on the Sakura-dōri Line.  Line extension plans are underway for the future because ridership is very high.

Transportation
 Nonami Station on the Sakura-dōri Line.
 "Nonami" bus stop serviced by the Nagoya City Municipal Bus service.

References

Neighbourhoods of Nagoya